Yoon Young-geul is a South Korean footballer who plays as a goalkeeper. With the South Korea national team, she participated at the 2015 FIFA Women's World Cup.

References

External links

Yoon Young-geul at the Korea Football Association (KFA)
Yoon Young-geul at the Korea Women's Football Federation (KWFF)

1987 births
Living people
People from Pyeongtaek
Sportspeople from Gyeonggi Province
South Korean women's footballers
Women's association football goalkeepers
South Korea women's under-20 international footballers
South Korea women's international footballers
2015 FIFA Women's World Cup players
Suwon FC Women players
AGF Fodbold (women) players
WK League players
Elitedivisionen players
Footballers at the 2018 Asian Games
Asian Games bronze medalists for South Korea
Asian Games medalists in football
Medalists at the 2018 Asian Games
South Korean expatriate footballers
South Korean expatriate sportspeople in Denmark
Expatriate women's footballers in Denmark